Constitution of 1946 may refer to:

Brazilian Constitution of 1946
French Constitution of 27 October 1946
1946 Constitution of El Salvador
1946 Yugoslav Constitution